Dietrich, also known as Dietrich of Ringelheim, was a Saxon count of the Middle Ages.

Biography 
Dietrich (Theodoric), sometimes called Dietrich of Ringelheim in later literature, was a medieval Saxon count in the German region of Westphalia. According to contemporary chronicles, his Immedinger family stemmed from the House of the Saxon duke Widukind. Dietrich was probably born in the second half of the 9th century, a few decades after the Saxons were brought under the control of Charlemagne's Frankish empire. His date of death remains uncertain, but might have been after the 910s according to the Memoirs of the Royal Academy of Sciences and Letters. According to genealogieonline, Dietrich died between 916 and 920.

Dietrich apparently married twice, first to Gisela of Lotharingia with whom he had a son, Beuve II, the Bishop of Châlons-sur-Marne, and three daughters: Amalrada, Bia, and Frederuna, who married Charles the Simple King of West Francia and King of Lotharingia.
Secondly he married Reinhild, who was of "royal Danish and Frisian blood". With her he had Matilda, who married Henry the Fowler, King of East Francia.

References

House of Immedinger

9th-century births
Year of birth uncertain
9th-century Saxon people
10th-century Saxon people
10th-century deaths
Year of death uncertain